The following is the list of the 182 barangays of Davao City, Philippines, arranged according to the 3 legislative districts and 11 administrative districts of Davao City.

Legislative Districts of Davao City 

aCreated into separate barangays under Sangguniang Panlungsod Ordinance No. 16103, ratified on July 25, 2004; taken from Barangay Pampanga.

References

NSCB ActiveStats: Davao City. Accessed on March 28, 2007.
Davao City Directory compilations. Accessed on March 28, 2007.
Census 2000 Final Count. Accessed on March 28, 2007.

Politics of Davao City
Davao City
Davao